Franklin Township is a township in Warren County, in the U.S. state of New Jersey.As of the 2020 United States census, the township's population was 2,968, a decrease of 208 (−6.5%) from the 2010 census count of 3,176, which in turn reflected an increase of 408 (+14.7%) from the 2,768 counted in the 2000 census. 

Franklin was incorporated as a township by the New Jersey Legislature on April 8, 1839, from portions of Greenwich Township, Mansfield Township, and Oxford Township. The township is named for Benjamin Franklin.

Geography
According to the U.S. Census Bureau, the township had a total area of 23.51 square miles (60.89 km2), including 23.42 square miles (60.66 km2) of land and 0.09 square miles (0.23 km2) of water (0.38%).

Asbury (with a 2010 Census population of 273), Broadway (244) and New Village (421) are unincorporated communities and census-designated places (CDPs)located within the township.

Other unincorporated communities, localities and place names located partially or completely within the township include Willow Grove.

Franklin Township borders the municipalities of Greenwich Township, Harmony Township and Washington Township in Warren County; and Bethlehem Township and Bloomsbury in Hunterdon County.

Demographics

The township's economic data (as is all of Warren County) is calculated by the U.S. Census Bureau as part of the Allentown-Bethlehem-Easton, PA-NJ Metropolitan Statistical Area.

2010 census
  
The Census Bureau's 2006–2010 American Community Survey showed that (in 2010 inflation-adjusted dollars) median household income was $85,893 (with a margin of error of +/− $7,764) and the median family income was $98,333 (+/− $7,142). Males had a median income of $69,784 (+/− $9,633) versus $59,750 (+/− $16,881) for females. The per capita income for the borough was $38,178 (+/− $4,746). About 7.2% of families and 5.2% of the population were below the poverty line, including 4.6% of those under age 18 and 9.2% of those age 65 or over.

2000 census
As of the 2000 U.S. census, there were 2,768 people, 972 households, and 750 families residing in the township. The population density was 115.4 people per square mile (44.5/km2).  There were 1,019 housing units at an average density of 42.5 per square mile (16.4/km2).  The racial makeup of the township was 97.04% White, 0.83% African American, 0.07% Native American, 0.87% Asian, 0.11% from other races, and 1.08% from two or more races. Hispanic or Latino of any race were 1.99% of the population.

There were 972 households, out of which 39.8% had children under the age of 18 living with them, 66.6% were married couples living together, 7.3% had a female householder with no husband present, and 22.8% were non-families. 18.6% of all households were made up of individuals, and 7.6% had someone living alone who was 65 years of age or older.  The average household size was 2.84 and the average family size was 3.28.

In the township, the population was spread out, with 28.8% under the age of 18, 5.1% from 18 to 24, 30.7% from 25 to 44, 25.3% from 45 to 64, and 10.2% who were 65 years of age or older. The median age was 38 years. For every 100 females, there were 102.8 males.  For every 100 females age 18 and over, there were 99.4 males.

The median income for a household in the township was $69,115, and the median income for a family was $72,763. Males had a median income of $47,569 versus $31,906 for females. The per capita income for the township was $27,224. About 2.4% of families and 3.1% of the population were below the poverty line, including 1.9% of those under age 18 and 15.3% of those age 65 or over.

Government

Local government 
Franklin Township is governed under the Township form of New Jersey municipal government, one of 141 municipalities (of the 564) statewide that use this form, the second-most commonly used form of government in the state. The Township Committee is comprised of five members, who are elected directly by the voters at-large in partisan elections to serve three-year terms of office on a staggered basis, with either one or two seats coming up for election each year as part of the November general election in a three-year cycle. At an annual reorganization meeting, the Township Committee selects one of its members to serve as Mayor and another to serve as Deputy Mayor.

, members of the Franklin Township Committee are Mayor Michael Toretta (R, term on committee ends December 31, 2024; term as mayor ends 2022), Deputy Mayor David Guth (R, term on committee ends 2024; term as deputy mayor ends 2022), Bonnie Butler (R, 2023), Mike Ferri (R, 2022), Richard Herzer (R, 2022).

In 2018, the township had an average property tax bill of $9,022, the highest in the county, compared to an average bill of $8,767 statewide.

Federal, state, and county representation 
Franklin Township is located in the 7th Congressional District and is part of New Jersey's 23rd state legislative district.

Politics
As of March 2011, there were a total of 2,112 registered voters in Franklin Township, of which 396 (18.8% vs. 21.5% countywide) were registered as Democrats, 890 (42.1% vs. 35.3%) were registered as Republicans and 825 (39.1% vs. 43.1%) were registered as Unaffiliated. There was one voter registered to another party. Among the township's 2010 Census population, 66.5% (vs. 62.3% in Warren County) were registered to vote, including 88.6% of those ages 18 and over (vs. 81.5% countywide).

In the 2012 presidential election, Republican Mitt Romney received 921 votes (63.1% vs. 56.0% countywide), ahead of Democrat Barack Obama with 493 votes (33.8% vs. 40.8%) and other candidates with 27 votes (1.8% vs. 1.7%), among the 1,460 ballots cast by the township's 2,095 registered voters, for a turnout of 69.7% (vs. 66.7% in Warren County). In the 2008 presidential election, Republican John McCain received 960 votes (59.9% vs. 55.2% countywide), ahead of Democrat Barack Obama with 588 votes (36.7% vs. 41.4%) and other candidates with 39 votes (2.4% vs. 1.6%), among the 1,602 ballots cast by the township's 2,090 registered voters, for a turnout of 76.7% (vs. 73.4% in Warren County). In the 2004 presidential election, Republican George W. Bush received 967 votes (63.1% vs. 61.0% countywide), ahead of Democrat John Kerry with 529 votes (34.5% vs. 37.2%) and other candidates with 26 votes (1.7% vs. 1.3%), among the 1,533 ballots cast by the township's 1,900 registered voters, for a turnout of 80.7% (vs. 76.3% in the whole county).

In the 2013 gubernatorial election, Republican Chris Christie received 79.6% of the vote (730 cast), ahead of Democrat Barbara Buono with 18.2% (167 votes), and other candidates with 2.2% (20 votes), among the 932 ballots cast by the township's 2,148 registered voters (15 ballots were spoiled), for a turnout of 43.4%. In the 2009 gubernatorial election, Republican Chris Christie received 794 votes (68.8% vs. 61.3% countywide), ahead of Democrat Jon Corzine with 200 votes (17.3% vs. 25.7%), Independent Chris Daggett with 117 votes (10.1% vs. 9.8%) and other candidates with 25 votes (2.2% vs. 1.5%), among the 1,154 ballots cast by the township's 2,059 registered voters, yielding a 56.0% turnout (vs. 49.6% in the county).

Education 
The Franklin Township School District serves public school students in pre-kindergarten through sixth grade. As of the 2018–19 school year, the district, comprised of one school, had an enrollment of 201 students and 26.4 classroom teachers (on an FTE basis), for a student–teacher ratio of 7.6:1.

Public school students in seventh through twelfth grades attend the schools of the Warren Hills Regional School District, which also serves students from the municipalities of Mansfield Township, Washington Borough, Washington Township and Oxford Township (for 9–12 only, attending on a tuition basis). Schools in the district (with 2018–19 enrollment data from the National Center for Education Statistics) are 
Warren Hills Regional Middle School with 542 students in grades 7 and 8 (located in Washington Borough), and Warren Hills Regional High School with 1,205 students in grades 9–12 (located in Washington Township). The high school district is overseen by a nine-member board of education; seats are allocated to the constituent municipalities based on population, with one seat assigned to Franklin Township.

Students from the township and from all of Warren County are eligible to attend Ridge and Valley Charter School in Frelinghuysen Township (for grades K–8) or Warren County Technical School in Washington borough (for 9–12), with special education services provided by local districts supplemented throughout the county by the Warren County Special Services School District in Oxford Township (for PreK–12).

Transportation

Major roadways in Franklin Township include Interstate 78/US 22, which pass through the southern part very briefly with Exit 6 right on the border. Route 57 runs through the northern part of the township.

Notable people

People who were born in, residents of, or otherwise closely associated with Franklin Township include:

 Dom Fucci (born 1928), former professional football player for the Detroit Lions
 Pete Perini (1928–2008), former professional football player who played in the NFL for the Chicago Bears and Cleveland Browns

References

External links

Franklin Township website
History of Franklin Township

Surrounding communities

 
1839 establishments in New Jersey
Populated places established in 1839
Township form of New Jersey government
Townships in Warren County, New Jersey